The Camp Hill School District is a diminutive, suburban public school district serving the Borough of Camp Hill in Cumberland County, Pennsylvania At just  , Camp Hill is the smallest school district in Cumberland County and it is one of the smallest in the Commonwealth of Pennsylvania. The district is so small it does not offer school bus transportation and instead encourages students to walk. According to the July 1, 2007 local tax rolls, it serves a resident population of 6,367. By 2010, the district's population increased to 7,903 people. The total median age was 43.0 years compared to 40.1 years in Pennsylvania. The educational attainment levels for the population 25 and over were 96.8% high school graduates and 47.6% college graduates. In 2009, Camp Hill School  District residents' per capita income was $28,256, while the median family income was $303,000. Per district officials, it served 1,233 pupils in 2021.

Per District officials, in school year 2007-08 the Camp Hill School District provided basic educational services to 1,137 pupils through the employment of 94 teachers, 81 full-time and part-time support personnel, and six administrators. In 2009–2010, the district provided basic educational services to 1,190 pupils. It employed: 98 teachers, 80 full-time and part-time support personnel, and seven administrators. Camp Hill School District received $2.5 million in state funding in the 2009–2010 school year.

Schools
Camp Hill High School
Camp Hill Middle School
Hoover Elementary School k-2nd grade
Eisenhower Elementary School and Grace Milliman Pollock Performing Arts Center 3rd-5th 
Schaeffer Elementary School (Closed in June 2011) 

Camp Hill High School students may choose to attend Cumberland Perry Area Vocational and Technical School for training in the building trades, culinary arts and allied health services.

Extracurriculars
Camp Hill School District offers a wide variety of clubs, activities and an extensive sports program. Varsity and junior varsity athletic activities are under the Pennsylvania Interscholastic Athletic Association. The district participates in the Mid-Penn Conference, Tri-Valley League.

Sports
The district funds:

Boys
Baseball - AA
Basketball- AA
Cross country - Class A
Football - A
Golf - AA
Soccer - A
Swimming and diving
Tennis - AA
Track and field
Wrestling	 - AA

Girls
Basketball - AA
Cross country - Class A
Field hockey - AA
Golf - AA
Soccer (Fall) - A
Softball - AA
Swimming and diving
Tennis - AA
Track and field - AA

Middle school sports

Boys
Basketball
Football
Soccer
Wrestling	

Girls
Basketball
Field hockey 

According to PIAA directory July 2012

References

External links
 

Camp Hill, Pennsylvania
School districts in Cumberland County, Pennsylvania
Susquehanna Valley
Education in Harrisburg, Pennsylvania